Margaree Airport  is located  east southeast of Margaree Centre, Nova Scotia, Canada.

References

External links
See Page about this airport on COPA's Places to Fly airport directory

Registered aerodromes in Nova Scotia
Transport in Inverness County, Nova Scotia
Buildings and structures in Inverness County, Nova Scotia